PT Aviastar Mandiri, operating as Aviastar is an Indonesian growing domestic passenger airline based in East Jakarta, Jakarta, Indonesia.

History 
The airline was established on 12 June 2000 by Capt. Sugeng Triyono and his 4 colleagues which started as helicopter charter services company with various leased helicopters. Since 2003 Aviastar began operating fix wing aircraft with 2 units of DeHavilland Canada DHC-6-300 Twin Otters and began to drop its rotary wings operations.

Aviastar now is an established company dealing with air transportation services either for chartered flights or schedule flights and currently operates 4 units of DHC-6-300 and 3 units of BAe 146-200 with plan to order 3 units more of DHC-6-300 to add in its fleet before end of 2013.
 
Its main operation base is located in Jakarta (CGK) with other operation bases in Palangkaraya (PKY), Balikpapan (BPN), Makassar (UPG), Nabire (NBX) and Denpasar (DPS).

Destinations

Domestic
Samarinda – Samarinda Airport

Aviastar also serves 36 routes in commercial and government subsidiary pioneer flights, which the following domestic Indonesian destinations are some of them :
 Balikpapan - Melak
 Jakarta - Dumai
 Jakarta - Ketapang
 Ketapang - Pontianak
 Makassar - Selayar - Bima
 Makassar - Tana Toraja
 Palangkaraya - Muara Teweh
 Palangkaraya - Tumbang Samba

Future Destinations
 Bali - North Bali International Airport

Fleet

Current fleet
The Aviastar fleet consists of the following aircraft (as of August 2019):

Former fleet
The airline previously operated the following aircraft (as of August 2017):
 3 British Aerospace 146-200
 1 further De Havilland Canada DHC-6-300 Twin Otter

Accidents and incidents
 On 9 April 2009, an Aviastar BAe 146-300 PK-BRD, crashed to a mountain near Wamena, Papua, Indonesia, after a failed second approach for landing at Wamena Airport.
 On 2 October 2015, an Aviastar DHC-6 Twin Otter, registered as PK-BRM, operating Aviastar Flight 7503 with three crew members and seven passengers on board, crashed near Palopo 11 minutes after takeoff. The passengers were 4 adults, 2 children, and 1 baby. There were no survivors.

References

External links 
 
  Airline Update
  Data Maskapai Dirjen Perhubungan Udara Dephub

Airlines of Indonesia
Airlines established in 2003
Airlines formerly banned in the European Union
Indonesian companies established in 2003